Belmont Greene is a traditional neighborhood development in Ashburn, Virginia, located off Belmont Ridge Road about  west of Washington, DC. It is part of the Belmont census-designated place. The development is situated adjacent to Stone Bridge High School and Trailside Park. The Washington & Old Dominion Railroad Trail also goes along the border of the development.  The development consists of over 700 housing units and a  shopping center, including a bank and a number of stores and restaurants. There are two playgrounds and a small community pool that serve the needs of the Belmont Greene community.

History 
The immediate area around the development consisted of woods that had possibly in previous years been used as farmland. The area also had Belmont Station for the Washington and Old Dominion Railroad, located on what today is the present-day junction of Belmont Ridge Road and the W&OD Trail. All vestiges of the station (little more than an overhead cover ) have long since vanished.

Community features 
Belmont Greene has many features for the benefit of its residents. Belmont Station Elementary School of Loudoun County Public Schools, is located in the development and serves the Ashburn Farm community.  Stone Bridge High School and Trailside Middle School are located within walking distance.  Plans were scrapped to build a USPS facility near the commercial development next to the community.  An extension of Trailside Park includes a walking path that connects to the W&OD trail and a drainage pond.

Location 

Belmont Greene is located just off Belmont Ridge Road which directly connects with State Route 7.  The development borders Belmont Country Club as well as Trailside Park, with the W&OD trail cutting between them.  Luck Stone quarry is also just across from the development on the other side of Belmont Ridge Road.  Belmont Greene is also just a few miles away from historic Leesburg, the Loudoun county seat. Portsmouth Boulevard and Chesterton Street cut through the neighborhood. The neighborhood ends at the intersection of Portsmouth Boulevard, Leire Place, Nightwatch Street, Winkle Avenue, and Middlebury Street. All parts of the community use an Ashburn mailing address.

References 

 Belmont Greene Community Association public website
 
 Washington & Old Dominion Railroad A Photographic History (1847 to 1968)
 

Geography of Loudoun County, Virginia